Vuelve may refer to:

"Bombón de Azúcar" (song), a song by Ricky Martin
Bombón de Azúcar (album), an album by La Secta AllStar